Allan Alexander Warrack (born May 24, 1937) is a former politician from Alberta, Canada. He was in the Legislative Assembly of Alberta as a member of the governing Progressive Conservative caucus from 1971 to 1979. He held several portfolios in the government of Premier Peter Lougheed. He currently teaches at the University of Alberta.

Political career
Warrack first ran for a seat to the Alberta Legislature in the 1971 general election, as a Progressive Conservative candidate in the electoral district of Three Hills. He defeated the  incumbent, Raymond Ratzlaff, by eight votes to win the seat for his party.

After the election, Lougheed appointed Warrack Minister of Lands and Forests. In the 1975 general election, he defeated three other candidates. After the election, Lougheed moved Warrack to the Ministry of Utilities and Telephones. He retired from provincial politics at dissolution of the Assembly in 1979.

Late life
After leaving politics, Warrack became a Professor (Emeritus) at the University of Alberta with the Department of Marketing, Business Economics and Law in the Faculty of Business. He is also the Associate Dean of the Master of Public Management Program and Vice-President of Administration. He holds a position on the National Research Council of Canada.

References

External links
Legislative Assembly of Alberta Members Listing

1937 births
Living people
Members of the Executive Council of Alberta
Politicians from Calgary
Progressive Conservative Association of Alberta MLAs